Gideon's Day (originally released in the United States as Gideon of Scotland Yard) is a 1958 British-American police procedural crime film starring Jack Hawkins, Dianne Foster and Cyril Cusack. The film, which was directed by John Ford, was adapted from John Creasey's 1955 novel of the same title.

This was the first film to feature a character named George Gideon, but Jack Hawkins had played a similar role in the British film The Long Arm two years earlier. Gideon was later played by John Gregson in the TV series Gideon's Way.

Plot
The film follows a day in the life of Detective Chief Inspector George Gideon of the Metropolitan Police. His day starts when he receives information that one of his officers has been taking bribes. Despite his hectic schedule, his wife reminds him his daughter has a violin recital that evening; she also tells him her aunt and uncle are coming for tea before the concert. This becomes a recurring theme throughout the film, as Gideon is continually hampered in his efforts to finish work and return home.

On the way to Scotland Yard he drops his daughter off at the Royal College of Music, but is stopped by a young constable for running a red light. Once at his office, he calls in the detective whom a "snout" [i.e. informant] has told him is taking bribes and suspends him. Gideon then gets word that an escaped mental patient from Manchester is on his way to London. Meanwhile, an audacious gang is robbing payrolls.

The mental patient is soon arrested, but not before he has killed the daughter of his former landlady. Gideon wants to congratulate personally the policeman who made the arrest, only to discover it is the same young officer who gave him a summons for his early morning traffic offence. Various jobs then preoccupy the chief inspector while his detectives continue to investigate the bribery case. News then arrives that the suspended policeman has been run down by a car — whose tyre tracks match one used in the earlier payroll jobs. After Gideon visits the dead officer's wife, evidence soon emerges that links the dead detective to a woman, Mrs. Delafield, who went to clubs he frequented.

Gideon goes to her address and discovers that the woman's husband Paul was responsible for the robberies, because he wanted the financial means to be a painter. The husband then tricks his wife into holding a gun on Gideon while he makes his escape. The detective uses his calm manner to defuse the situation. But before he can return home, the phone rings again. A safety deposit firm has been robbed by a gang of rich socialites who have been cornered inside. When the police finally draw them out, Gideon catches one of the gang himself. But he loses his temper when he finds out that the elderly night watchman was killed in cold blood by the man he arrested, telling him "you'll hang for this, you rich nobody!"

Finally Gideon gets home. His wife tells him that their daughter has met a nice young man at her recital. It turns out it's the young constable again. He had been holding the chief inspector's concert ticket all day following their first encounter that morning. This led him to meet Gideon's daughter, who is quite taken by him. But finally, just as they are all sitting down to supper, the phone rings one last time. A man believed to be Paul the painter has been arrested at London Airport. The film concludes with a final irony. The young constable, who is driving Gideon to the airport, is stopped by another policeman as he races through the capital's foggy streets for running a red light — and is unable to produce his driving licence!

Cast 
 Jack Hawkins - DCI George Gideon
 Dianne Foster - Joanna Delafield
 Cyril Cusack - Herbert ‘Birdie’ Sparrow
 Maureen Potter - Mrs Sparrow
 Andrew Ray - PC Simon Farnaby Green
 Anna Massey - Sally Gideon
 James Hayter - Robert Mason
 Ronald Howard - Paul Delafield
 Howard Marion-Crawford - The Chief
 Laurence Naismith - Arthur Sayer
 Derek Bond - Detective Sergeant Kirby
 Anna Lee - Kate Gideon
 John Loder - Ponsford "The Duke"
 Miles Malleson - Judge
 John Le Mesurier - Prosecuting Counsel (uncredited)
 Robert Raglan - Dawson (uncredited)
 Michael Trubshawe - Sergeant "Golly" Golightly
 Jack Watling - Reverend Small
 Francis Crowdy - Francis Fitzhubert
 Grizelda Hervey - Mrs Kirby

Production
The film, which was shot on location in and around London, was Anna Massey's cinematic debut (she was aged 19 at the time). Interiors were completed at the MGM-British Studios, Borehamwood in Hertfordshire, England.

References

External links
 

1958 films
1958 crime films
Films based on British novels
Films directed by John Ford
Columbia Pictures films
Films scored by Douglas Gamley
British crime films
Films set in London
1950s police procedural films
Films shot at MGM-British Studios
1950s English-language films
1950s British films
Cultural depictions of Metropolitan Police officers